Jean Savard (born April 26, 1957) is a Canadian former professional ice hockey player. He played 45 games in the National Hockey League with the Chicago Black Hawks and Hartford Whalers between 1977 and 1980.

Biography
Savard was born in Verdun, Quebec. As a youth, he played in the 1969 Quebec International Pee-Wee Hockey Tournament with a minor ice hockey team from Verdun. He placed junior hockey in the Quebec Major Junior Hockey League, winning the scoring championship in 1976–77. In 1977, Savard was drafted by both the National Hockey League and World Hockey Association. Savard signed with the Chicago Black Hawks of the NHL, and played 42 games with Chicago and its farm team, the Dallas Black Hawks. Savard was claimed by the Hartford Whalers in the expansion draft and played one further game in the NHL. Savard played his final full season with the Binghamton Whalers in 1980–81. Savard sat out the 1981–82 season after being released by the St. Louis Blues. He played a tryout in 1982–83 with the Salt Lake Golden Eagles before retiring.

Career statistics

Regular season and playoffs

References

External links
 

1957 births
Living people
Binghamton Whalers players
Birmingham Bulls draft picks
Canadian expatriate ice hockey players in the United States
Canadian ice hockey centres
Chicago Blackhawks draft picks
Chicago Blackhawks players
Dallas Black Hawks players
Hartford Whalers players
Montreal Juniors players
Montreal Bleu Blanc Rouge players
New Brunswick Hawks players
People from Verdun, Quebec
Quebec Remparts players
Salt Lake Golden Eagles (CHL) players
Ice hockey people from Montreal
Springfield Indians players